Anthony John Ballantyne (born Dunedin, 1972) is a New Zealand historian at the University of Otago, Dunedin, New Zealand. After completing his schooling at King's High School, Dunedin, he graduated BA at the University of Otago, Dunedin and obtained a PhD at the University of Cambridge. After stints abroad, he returned to the University of Otago, Dunedin, where his career advanced.

Controversy
Ballantyne was Pro-Vice-Chancellor of Humanities at Otago's Dunedin campus from 2015 to 2020, a time characterised by controversy. He initiated a process that resulted in sixteen full-time equivalent academic staff being made redundant, with other academics impelled to take early retirement. He also advocated eliminating the Art History program and it was subsequently disestablished. Through a series of articles and editorials, the Otago Daily Times reported on these and other changes. The series exposed a 'negative, top-down, management culture that undermined trust, productivity and mental health' and that created a 'climate of suppression…and fear of repercussions'. This produced 'demoralised teachers and researchers' who were 'locked in pain and anger at what their institution had become'. '[E]ven the brightest and best academics secure in their status and position' felt 'acute discontent'. 

In October 2020 the University of Otago stated that, as of 2021, Ballantyne would no longer serve as PVC and would instead lead the Division of External Engagement In this capacity he attends to the University's alumni relations, its liaising with secondary schools, and raising the profile of the University.

Scholarship
Ballantyne has established a scholarly reputation primarily within New Zealand academia, including being elected as a Fellow of the Royal Society of New Zealand in 2012. In 2016 he was awarded the Humanities Aronui Medal from the Royal Society of New Zealand.

Ballantyne’s work examines the development of imperial intellectual and cultural life in New Zealand, Ireland, India, and Britain. The work is derived from the tradition of scholarship that sees colonialism as a cultural undertaking as well as a political and economic project. 

He has analysed the British empire as a 'web,' with 'vertical' connections developing between Britain and its colonies and 'horizontal' connections linking various colonies directly. He has helped shed light on how these 'webs of empire' incorporated new lands and peoples. More specifically, Orientalism and Race (2001) analysed the 'orientalizing' texts of British officials in colonial India and their attempts to decode both Hinduism and Sikhism more broadly in terms of their understandings of Aryanism and race; at the same time it examined similar discourses directed toward understandings of Māori as, first, "Semitic", then Indo-Aryan, and ultimately, Māori reconfigurations of Christianity on their own terms. Ballantyne has received his share of criticism. One scholar points to Ballantyne’s analyses as undergirded by an ‘egregious understanding of race’.

With regard to Sikh studies, Ballantyne has been among those who have criticised scholarship that focuses too much on Sikh textual traditions, arguing that the experiences of colonialism and migration have been crucial in making Sikh identities.

In recent years Ballantyne has returned to focus on New Zealand's colonial history. This work has sought to connect New Zealand's colonial culture by noting the links with China and India. Along the lines of Benedict Anderson's formulation of 'print capitalism', Ballantyne has, in turn, addressed the place of print culture and literacy in the encounters between Māori and the Pākehā colonists. He has also addressed the place of race and religion in cross-cultural history  His most recent work, Entanglements of Empire (2014), focuses on early New Zealand history and the foundations of relationship between Māori and Pākehā. It was awarded the W.H. Oliver prize for the best book on New Zealand history between 2013 and 2015 by the New Zealand Historical Association. 

With Antoinette Burton he has also written about world history, highlighting the importance of race and gender in cross-cultural encounters.

Works
Entanglements of Empire: Missionaries, Māori, and the Question of the Body (Duke University Press, 2014).
Webs of Empire: Locating New Zealand's Colonial Past (Bridget Williams Books, 2012).
Between Colonialism and Diaspora: Sikh Cultural Formations in an Imperial World (Duke University Press, 2006).
Orientalism and Race: Aryanism in the British Empire (Cambridge Imperial and Post-Colonial Studies Series, Palgrave, 2001).
Co-editor, Moving Subjects: Gender, Mobility and Intimacy in an Age of Global Empire (University of Illinois Press, 2007).
Editor, Textures of the Sikh Past: New Historical Interpretations (Oxford University Press, 2007).
Co-editor, Disputed Histories: Reimagining New Zealand's Pasts (Otago University Press, 2006).
Co-editor, Bodies in Contact: Rethinking Colonial Encounters in World History (Duke University Press, 2005).

References

External links
 Research summary, Otago University
 Staff Profile, Otago University

1972 births
Alumni of the University of Cambridge
Historians of the British Empire
Historians of South Asia
Living people
21st-century New Zealand historians
University of Otago alumni
Academic staff of the University of Otago
People educated at King's High School, Dunedin
Fellows of the Royal Society of New Zealand